Manasvi Kottachi is an Indian Child actress who works in Tamil and Malayalam films.

Career 
Manasvi Kottachi debuted with Imaikkaa Nodigal (2018) playing Nayanthara's daughter, garnering high popularity before starring in Suttu Pidikka Utharavu (2019). She played one of the lead roles in the Malayalam film My Santa (2019) with Dileep. She went on to star in Darbar (2020) and several other films. She will play the lead role in the horror film Kanmani Pappa directed by Sree Mani.

Personal life 
She is the daughter of comedian Kottachi, who appeared in supporting comedic roles alongside Vivek.

Filmography 
All films are in Tamil, unless otherwise noted.

Television

Awards & Nominations

References

External links 

Living people
Indian film actresses
Child actresses in Tamil cinema
Actors in Tamil cinema
21st-century Indian child actresses
Child actresses in Malayalam cinema
Year of birth missing (living people)
Child artists